Daniels County is a county located in the U.S. state of Montana. As of the 2020 census, the population was 1,661. Its county seat is Scobey. It is on Montana's north border, and thus abuts the Canada–US border with Saskatchewan.

History
Daniels County was created in 1920 from portions of Sheridan and Valley Counties. The name comes from Mansfield Daniels, a local rancher.

Geography

Daniels County is predominantly rolling plains. The Poplar River flows through the county.

Major highways
  Montana Highway 5
  Montana Highway 13

Adjacent counties and rural municipalities

 Rural Municipality (RM) of Old Post No. 43, Saskatchewan (SK) - northwest
 RM of Poplar Valley No. 12, SK - north
 RM of Hart Butte No. 11, SK - north
 RM of Happy Valley No. 10, SK - northeast
 Sheridan County - east
 Roosevelt County - south
 Valley County - west

Politics

Demographics

2000 census
As of the 2000 census, there were 2,017 people, 892 households, and 561 families living in the county. The population density was 1.4 people per square mile (0.55/km2). There were 1,154 housing units at an average density of 1 per square mile (0/km2). The racial makeup of the county was 96.03% White, 1.29% Native American, 0.25% Asian, 0.10% Pacific Islander, 0.59% from other races, and 1.74% from two or more races. 1.59% of the population were Hispanic or Latino of any race. 35.7% were of Norwegian, 20.0% German, 7.8% Irish and 5.5% French ancestry.

There were 892 households, out of which 23.70% had children under the age of 18 living with them, 54.90% were married couples living together, 5.50% had a female householder with no husband present, and 37.10% were non-families. 33.60% of all households were made up of individuals, and 17.50% had someone living alone who was 65 years of age or older. The average household size was 2.22 and the average family size was 2.84.

The county population contained 22.10% under the age of 18, 4.90% from 18 to 24, 20.00% from 25 to 44, 29.50% from 45 to 64, and 23.50% who were 65 years of age or older. The median age was 47 years. For every 100 females there were 96.00 males. For every 100 females age 18 and over, there were 97.90 males.

The median income for a household in the county was $27,306, and the median income for a family was $35,722. Males had a median income of $24,405 versus $18,421 for females. The per capita income for the county was $16,055. About 13.40% of families and 16.90% of the population were below the poverty line, including 19.20% of those under age 18 and 13.20% of those age 65 or over.

2010 census
As of the 2010 census, there were 1,751 people, 798 households, and 481 families living in the county. The racial makeup of the county was 95.7% white, 2.1% American Indian, 0.2% black or African American, 0.2% Asian, 0.1% from other races, and 1.7% from two or more races. Those of Hispanic or Latino origin made up 1.5% of the population. In terms of ancestry, 39.4% were Norwegian, 31.8% were German, 9.0% were English, 8.3% were Irish, and 1.2% were American.

Of the 798 households, 21.8% had children under the age of 18 living with them, 52.1% were married couples living together, 4.6% had a female householder with no husband present, 39.7% were non-families, and 35.1% of all households were made up of individuals. The average household size was 2.14 and the average family size was 2.77. The median age was 50.4 years.

The median income for a household in the county was $38,125 and the median income for a family was $49,479. Males had a median income of $36,250 versus $25,921 for females. The per capita income for the county was $24,737. About 9.8% of families and 14.1% of the population were below the poverty line, including 20.6% of those under age 18 and 9.0% of those age 65 or over.

Economy
The main source of income for Daniels County has been cattle and dryland wheat.

Education
There is one K-12 school serving all of Daniels County, Scobey High School.

Communities

City
 Scobey (county seat)

Town
 Flaxville

Census-designated places 

 Peerless

 Whitetail

Unincorporated communities

 Carbert
 Four Buttes
 Navajo
 Pleasant Prairie
 West Fork

See also
 List of lakes in Daniels County, Montana
 List of mountains in Daniels County, Montana
 National Register of Historic Places listings in Daniels County MT

References

 
1920 establishments in Montana
Populated places established in 1920